John McMillan Shearer (8 July 1917 – 3 April 1979) was a Scottish professional football player and coach.

Career
After serving with the British Army during World War Two, Shearer signed a professional contract with Derby County in 1946. He left later that same year to sign for Bradford City, where he spent three seasons before moving to Grimsby Town.

After retiring as a player in 1951, Shearer became manager of Irish club Sligo Rovers.

References

External links
 

1917 births
1979 deaths
Scottish footballers
Scottish football managers
Derby County F.C. players
Bradford City A.F.C. players
Grimsby Town F.C. players
English Football League players
Sligo Rovers F.C. managers
League of Ireland managers
Association football inside forwards